Haugating was a Thing in medieval Norway.  Haugating served as an assembly for the regions around Vestfold and the area west of Oslofjord. It was located at Tønsberg  in Vestfold,  Norway.

Background
Although it was not as recognized nationally as the Øreting in Trøndelag, Haugating did play an important role in the history of Norway as a site for the proclamation of kings. At various times, Harald Gille, Sigurd Magnusson, Magnus Erlingsson and Jon Kuvlung were all proclaimed there to be contenders to the throne of Norway. 

Haugating was seated in Tønsberg at Haugar (from the Old Norse word haugr meaning hill or burial mound). During the Civil war era in Norway (between 1130-1240), Tonsberg  was one of the area where the Bagler faction and other rebel bands stood strong in the battle against the Birchleg.   Several rebel bands hailed their royal subjects from Haugating. A memorial stone was erected on the site during 1954.

Haugar Vestfold Kunstmuseum
Haugar Vestfold Art Museum (Haugar Vestfold Kunstmuseum) is located at the site of the former Haugating. The museum opened to the public 1995 and since 2009 has been associated with Vestfold Museum (Vestfoldmuseene). This is an art museum  with exhibitions principally featuring Norwegian contemporary art. The museum features works by Odd Nerdrum and Frans Widerberg as well as works by Kjartan Slettemark among others. The museum is associated with Vestfold Museum (Vestfoldmuseene).

Haugar Vestfold Art Museum took over the former premises of  Tønsberg Navigation School  (Tønsberg Navigasjonsskole). The building  was built 1918-1921 and designed by architects Andreas Bjercke and Georg Eliassen.  Their design was awarded the  Houen Foundation Award in 1925. The building is adorned with twelve caryatid  which were created by the sculptor Wilhelm Rasmussen between 1920-1922.

References

Other sources
Orning, Hans Jacob (2008) Unpredictability and Presence: Norwegian Kingship in the High Middle Ages (Leiden: BRILL)

Related Reading
Andersen, Per Sveaas (1977) Samlingen av Norge og kristningen av landet : 800–1130 (Oslo: Universitetsforlaget)

External links
Haugar Vestfold Kunstmuseum website
 Vestfoldmuseene website
Tønsberg Viking Festival

Legal history of Norway
Thing (assembly)
Law of Norway